Finally It's Christmas is the second Christmas album by American pop rock group Hanson. The band wrote and produced the album with Mark Hudson, who also collaborated on the band's first Christmas release, Snowed In (1997). Several of the band's children also make appearances in some songs. The album was released on October 27, 2017.

Background
Taylor Hanson on why it took so long to do another Christmas album:

Composition
The album features a mix of classic Christmas covers from Elvis Presley's "Blue Christmas" to Mariah Carey's "All I Want for Christmas Is You" (renamed "All I Want for Christmas") as well as a mash up of "Joy to the World" and "Go Tell It on the Mountain" and four original songs.

Track listing
 "Finally It's Christmas" – 3:45
 "Wonderful Christmas Time" – 3:12 
 "Rudolph the Red-Nosed Reindeer" – 0:28
 "'Til New Year's Night" – 3:24
 "Please Come Home" – 3:27
 "Someday at Christmas" – 2:48
 "Joy to the Mountain" – 2:40
 "Jingle Bells" – 0:20
 "Happy Christmas" – 1:37
 "All I Want for Christmas" – 3:29
 "Winter Wonderland" – 2:39
 "Blue Christmas" – 2:58
 "Peace on Earth" – 3:27
 "Have Yourself a Merry Little Christmas" – 2:42

Track listing adapted from the iTunes Store.

Charts

References

2017 Christmas albums
Christmas albums by American artists
Hanson (band) albums